Michalis Ziogas (Greek: Μιχάλης Ζιώγας; born 27 June 1962) is a Greek former professional footballer who played as a centre forward. He played for AEL from 1982 to 1989 being one of the greatest players the club ever had. He was the team's head coach from 20 March 2012, until his dismissal on 8 January 2013. He is currently the head coach of AEL.

International career
Ziogas appeared in three matches for the senior Greece national football team from 1986 to 1988.

Honours
AEL
 Greek Championship (1): 1987–88
 Greek Cup: 1985

References

External links

sportlarissa.gr

1962 births
Living people
Footballers from Larissa
Greek footballers
Greece international footballers
Athlitiki Enosi Larissa F.C. players
Pierikos F.C. managers
Aris Thessaloniki F.C. players
Levadiakos F.C. players
Ionikos F.C. players
Super League Greece players
Olympiacos Volos F.C. managers
Association football forwards
Greek football managers